"Sly" is a song by Australian rock band the Cat Empire that was the first single released from their 2005 album, Two Shoes. The song peaked at number 23 on the Australian Singles Chart and placed at number 38 in the Triple J Hottest 100, 2005.

Track listing

Charts

References

2005 singles
The Cat Empire songs
2005 songs
EMI Records singles